Wendy May Carter Clarkson (née Wendy Carter; born March 11, 1956, Glasgow, Scotland) is a Canadian badminton champion who was ranked third in the world in 1978 and also medalled or ranked at Canadian Open, national, Commonwealth Games and Pan Am Games.

Career 
Clarkson won her first single Canadian title in the women's singles in 1976, having been a junior champion the year before. That year, she also won the Canadian Open. In 1977, she competed in the quarter-finals of All England. As a high school athlete in Edmonton, Alberta, at Strathcona Composite High School, she was recognized for her prowess in badminton as Athlete of the Year. In the 1960s, she took up badminton. She won the 1975 Canadian junior badminton singles title. With Tracey Vanwassenhove, she won the junior girls' doubles competition. With Cam Dalgleish, she won the mixed doubles in the Open National Badminton Championships.

In 1976, she won the Canadian Ladies' Singles title. The next year, she won the Badminton Pan Am Championship. During the 1978 Commonwealth Games in Edmonton, Alberta, she won silver in the team competition and bronze in the ladies' singles. That year, she was ranked as 3rd-best female badminton player in the world. In 1979, and 1980, she won top ladies' singles at the nationals and, with Claire Backhouse, she won top Doubles and, with Greg Carter, top mixed doubles. In 1981, she won gold in Ladies' Doubles with Sandra Skillings.  In 1982, she earned top Doubles with Bob MacDougal and top ladies doubles with Sandra Skillings.

Education 
She earned a Bachelor of Education from the University of Calgary in 1989. In 2001, she was inducted into the University of Alberta's Sports Hall of Fame. Today she is a coach in Seattle, Washington.

Achievements 
Notes

References

1956 births
Living people
Sportspeople from Glasgow
Canadian female badminton players
University of Calgary alumni
Commonwealth Games medallists in badminton
Commonwealth Games silver medallists for Canada
Commonwealth Games bronze medallists for Canada
Badminton players at the 1978 Commonwealth Games
Medallists at the 1978 Commonwealth Games